Oskar Fotr (born 9 January 1996) is a Czech footballer who plays for SK Sparta Kolín.

Club career

FK Senica
Fotr made his Fortuna Liga debut for Senica against Ružomberok on 17 October 2020. Fotr came on to replace Tenton Yenne in the second half when Senica was one up. However, through two late goals by Štefan Gerec and José Carrillo (own goal), Senica lost the 1–2.

He scored his first goal for Senica during an away fixture against Pohronie on 24 October 2020. While Pohronie was leading through Dominik Špiriak, Fotr, who replaced Marko Totka at half-time, equalised in the 60th minute and Senica took the three points after a further strike by Tomáš Malec, leading to a 1–2 win.

References

External links
 FK Senica official club profile 
 Futbalnet profile 
 
 

1996 births
Living people
Footballers from Prague
Czech footballers
Czech expatriate footballers
Czech Republic youth international footballers
Association football forwards
SK Slavia Prague players
FK Varnsdorf players
FC Sellier & Bellot Vlašim players
FK Senica players
Czech National Football League players
Slovak Super Liga players
Expatriate footballers in Slovakia
Czech expatriate sportspeople in Slovakia